Aunis is a historical province of France, situated in the north-west of the department of Charente-Maritime. Its historic capital is La Rochelle, which took over from Castrum Allionis (Châtelaillon) the historic capital which gives its name to the province.

It was a fief of the Duchy of Aquitaine. It extended to Marais Poitevin in the north, Basse Saintonge (and Niortais) in the east, and Rochefortais in the south. Aunis had an influence approximately 20–25 km into the Isle of Ré (l'Île de Ré).

The province was officially recognised during the reign of Charles V of France in 1374: "In 1374, Charles V separated La Rochelle from Saintonge to set up a provincial government, comprising the jurisdictions of Rochefort, Marennes and, for a time, Benon. It was thus that Aunis legally became a separate province."

Aunis was the smallest province in France, in terms of area. Nowadays it is a part of the Charente-Maritime département together with Saintonge.

People from Aunis were called Aunisien (masculine) or Aunisienne (feminine). The English term is Aunisian.

Geography 
Aunis is mostly a rolling chalk plain, whose navigable rivers have always been important modes of communication, and from which came economic development and the urbanisation of the region.

The region is coastal, with varied seafronts and offshore islands, from which maritime activities diversified. Nowadays tourism is of great importance.

Geographic framework 

Aunis has two river borders, those of the Sèvre Niortaise in the north, and the Charente in the south. To the west is the Atlantic Ocean and two islands, the Île de Ré and the Île d'Aix. To the east it is bordered by the valley of the Mignon (the main left tributary of the Sèvre Niortaise), by the hills of Saintonge around Saint-Félix, and by the valleys of the Trézence and Boutonne.

Aunis is a chalk plain of the Jurassic period, characterised by gently rolling hills, where no valley is completely enclosed, and where the land has a regular descent towards the sea. The islands of Ré and Aix were made at the same time and from the same type of rock. The chalk table completes the triangular promontory which juts into the Atlantic, forming the northern extremity of the Aquitaine Basin.

Large freshwater and seawater marshes have formed in places that have been drained, hardly altering the general relief. The seawater marshes correspond to ancient marine gulfs, made from marine or fluvial sediments. Since the Middle Ages they have been continuously drained by people. In the north, the Marais Poitevin dries up, at the centre there are the valleys of the small river Curé and its main tributary the Virson and in the east the valley of the Mignon. In the south is the marshland of "Little Flanders", drained since the 17th century. Together these constitute an important reservoir of fresh water, essential for the agricultural and snail-farming activities of the north of the department.

Transport 
The geography of the plain was always very unfavourable for communications. The region was almost an enclave, and for a long time on the margins of the French kingdom politically as well as geographically.

Huge efforts were made to break this geographical isolation. Without doubt the most spectacular was the coming of the railway in 1857, running from La Rochelle and Rochefort to Paris. This line has been repeatedly modernised (made double track, and electrified in 1993 for use by the TGV).

The regional railways connecting Nantes to Bordeaux also serve Aunis, passing through La Rochelle, Châtelaillon-Plage and Rochefort.

Roads have also been considerably modernised, notably the roads from La Rochelle to Rochefort, from La Rochelle to Niort, the A837 autoroute from Rochefort to Saintes, the viaduct over the Charente at Rochefort, the ring road around La Rochelle, and the bridge to the Île de Ré, all of which are now dual carriageways.

The modernisation of communication infrastructure had its heyday in the second half of the 19th century, at the end of the Second French Empire, and economic activity diversified.

Agricultural and maritime activities 
The two principal agricultural resources are intensive arable farming (wheat, maize, oil seed) and livestock farming. Dairy cows have long been the mainstay, but more and more cows and bulls are raised for beef (principally in the marshy areas).

Vineyards were virtually abandoned after phylloxera wiped them out in 1876, although there are still some on the Île de Ré.

At sea, between the estuary of the Sèvre Niortaise and the north of La Rochelle, mussel farming has an important place, while Fouras and the Marais d'Yves Nature Reserve are the main centres for oyster farming. La Rochelle keeps its place as a fishing port thanks to its modern port of Chef-de-Baie, but even so fishing is in decline.

Reclamation of sea salt from the marshes of Aunis brought the region its riches in the Middle Ages, but this has now completely disappeared from the coast of mainland Aunis. However, it still takes place on the Île de Ré and notably on the nearby Île d'Ars, and has lately achieved a certain notability for its small-volume craft production and minimal postprocessing.

In the north-east of Aunis there is a huge forest of hardwood trees, the Forest of Benon, which has been protected because it is unique to the region.

Industrial diversification 
La Rochelle Chamber of Commerce
Rochefort and Saintonge Chamber of Commerce and Industry

Aunis does not have the strong industrial tradition which is the trademark of regions of the North and of Lorraine, and it was only at the end of the 19th century that factories started to be developed. After World War II, industry in Aunis continued, was reinforced, diversified and brought up-to-date.

Three industrial hubs emerged in Aunis to bring together the industries of Charente-Maritime:
 La Rochelle specialised in railway construction (Alstom) and naval construction (Chantiers navals Gamelin), motor parts (Delphi Corporation), food industries (Senoble), chemicals and pharmaceuticals (Rhodia) and pleasure boats (Dufour, Fontaine-Pajot). It is by far the largest hub of the department. It is also a large commercial port, the eighth largest in all France.
 Rochefort and Tonnay-Charente developed port activities on the river Charente. The two towns have diverse industrial activities with aerospace (EADS, Simair), automotive industry, ferrous and non-ferrous metals, chemical and plastics industries, pleasure boating, among them. The industrial area of Rochefort-Tonnay-Charente is the second hub of the department.
 Surgères has become a hub for the food industry, augmented by metallurgical and plastic industries.

In addition there are two smaller, newer industrial areas: Aigrefeuille-d'Aunis and Marans, Charente-Maritime.

Tourism 

Thanks to the sea, Aunis developed its tourist potential which, in the late 19th century, came to the fore with the trend for sea bathing. Bathing beaches such as Châtelaillon-Plage and Fouras gained notability, while the larger beaches such as those of the Île de Ré became national treasures from the 1960s. The Pertuis d'Antioche, which is effectively an inland sea, was popular for pleasure boating in the 1970s. La Rochelle, with its immense Port des Minimes, can hold  pleasure boats, and has become the largest pleasure boating port on the French Atlantic. Ars-en-Ré, La Flotte and Saint-Martin-de-Ré are also well-known pleasure ports, while the river ports of Marans on the Sèvre niortaise, and Rochefort, on the Charente, had disused port basins that have become home to pleasure boats, and can each take more than 200 craft.

The Île de Ré lives totally by tourism and can accommodate up to  tourists during the summer season. This "invasion" is even more pronounced on the Île d'Aix which accommodates up to  tourists each year, even though it does not have a car bridge.

Aunis has also developed its cultural and urban tourism with its two great historical towns of La Rochelle and Rochefort. The small towns of the interior are not without interest and have enhanced their heritage sites, like Surgères (Notre-Dame church, castle, renovated town centre) and Marans (port and river site), Tonnay-Charente (management of Charente quays). Aunis has made huge efforts to put in place green tourism and has developed, notably at Aigrefeuille-d'Aunis, quality tourist bases (lac de Frace, tourist complex of La Taillée).

Demography 
In 2006 the region had  inhabitants, nearly half the total population of Charente-Maritime (47.9%).

In 2010, the northwest of the department had ten of the seventeen towns of over  inhabitants, and 31 of the department's 60 communes of over  inhabitants.

The ratio of urban to rural population is comparable to the national average, which is 3:4. This is considerably different from Charente-Maritime as a whole, where the ratio is nearer 3:5.

The region became considerably more urban after World War II, though the population is unevenly distributed. Above all, the Aunis coastal towns have expanded to provide the larger part of employment and leisure.

La Rochelle and Rochefort are the most populous urban areas not just in Aunis but in all Charente-Maritime. The two towns are becoming twin cities with many suburbs, connected by regular railway trains. This heavily built-up area is now home to over  inhabitants ( inhabitants in 2006). This urban area is second in the region after the "Clain corridor", which runs between Poitiers and Châtellerault. Near the coast the towns have formed a dense urban web and the population density is particularly high:  in the three cantons of Rochefort,  in the canton of Aytré,  in the combined cantons of La Rochelle. The La Rochelle-Rochefort twin city area alone includes nine towns of the seventeen with more than  inhabitants, and twenty communes with more than  inhabitants, of the sixty in Charente-Maritime in 2006.

It is still a mostly rural region, but is rapidly becoming more built-up.

Urbanisation has been just as fast on the Île de Ré, especially in the east.

The principal towns of Aunis are:
 La Rochelle with  inhabitants is by far the most populous town in the Charente-Maritime department.
 Rochefort is the third town of Charente-Maritime, after La Rochelle and Saintes, but together with Tonnay-Charente it is the second largest urban area in the department with  inhabitants, making it equal fifth in the Poitou-Charentes region.
 Surgères with  inhabitants, is the twelfth largest town in Charente-Maritime.

 Fouras regenerated into a vibrant small seaside resort in the 1990s. The town now has about  inhabitants.
 Aigrefeuille d'Aunis, with  inhabitants, leads the Communauté de communes Plaine d'Aunis which, with  inhabitants, is the most populated of the Pays d'Aunis.
 On the Île de Ré, Saint-Martin-de-Ré and  La Flotte make up a small urban area with  inhabitants, but Sainte-Marie-de-Ré is the most populous single commune, with  inhabitants.

Toponymy 

The name of the province appears for the first time in history in 785 AD.

But the etymology of the name has been given many different interpretations and folk etymologies that are still used today. Even so, some people think "The most probable origin is that the town of Aulnay (Aulnay en Saintongeais), which was more important in the Middle Ages than it is today. Aulnay marked the frontier between Santones and Pictones. Little by little the province shrank until the frontier was situated a long way from Aulnay. It is the smallest province in France". Even now, there is no consensus among historians and etymologists.

Etymologists have proposed three possible interpretations which deserve consideration:
 the etymology must be interpreted as being cognate with that of an ancient barbaric people. According to some historians, Aunis was populated by a tribe of Alani, who invaded Gaul in 406 AD. Delayant in his time described the idea that the Alani would have settled in Aunis: "Their attacks were at first aimed at looting rather than conquest. The Vandals had merely passed through. We must think of their stragglers. Some of them, turned back by the Visigoths, hid (so it is said) in this refuge between Sèvre and the Charente, and their name furnished one of numerous etymologies that have been given to the word Aunis."
 the name of Aunis is related to the eventful history of the town of Châtelaillon in mediaeval times. This last theory has found favour with a large number of historians.

History 
In ancient times the region was a long way from civilisation. It was not until the Middle Ages that the province entered history, when La Rochelle sealed its fate and became its capital.

The "pays des aulnes" in antiquity 

In Celtic and Gallo-Roman times, the northern part of Santonie, which became called "Aunis", was a long-neglected region far from civilisation, with no communications.

The old "Forest of Argenson" covered the entire region. For many centuries this huge forest made a near-impenetrable natural frontier stretching from the rivers Boutonne and Charente to the east, which kept it apart from the ancient province of the Pictones.

Moreover, the deep sea gulfs (Gulf of Pictones, to the north, Gulf of Santones, to the south) made it a slender peninsula. This geographic isolation made communications and trade very poor. One can see from a road map of Gallo-Roman times, Aunis is entirely absent. This Roman road is found in the "Table de Peutinger", where again no Roman road goes into Aunis.

Finally, the valleys of the rivers Curé, Virson, Mignon, and Gères, which were much larger than today, cut deeply through the region's invading forest. But they had the inconvenience of being marshy and prone to floods that turned them into real marshes and bogs, making the region particularly difficult to reach.

All these natural phenomena combined, so that it has been said "this region [...], often flooded and marshy, has its riches, is easy to defend, but cannot become the fulcrum for an attack".

The coast was occupied by the Celts, even during the time of  – they preferred to call the area Saintonge and themselves Santones – and then the Romans in the 1st century BC. Saintonge offered better living and working conditions than the northern area (Aunis) thanks to the large valleys of the river Charente and its two principal tributaries, the Seugne and the Boutonne. The huge Gironde Estuary of the Seudre allowed direct contact with the more advanced civilisation of the Roman Empire to the south, via the Garonne valley. Transport was largely on the waterways, even after the Romans had built their more advanced – and more expensive – roads.

Before the Roman conquest around the middle of the 1st century AD, the Celts had a stronghold over the northern shores of the Gulf of Santones. They had even colonised some of the islands in the gulf, which today are part of the Marais de Rochefort. The Santones had worked laboriously to perfect a technique of saltwater extraction, and their ancient production sites were put right on the shoreline. These small-scale production sites were particularly numerous in the north of the Gulf of Santones, equally along the coastline, in the deep estuaries, and all around the islands (notably the Île d'Albe).

The salt sites were quickly abandoned after the Roman conquest, because the new colonists brought with them a better-performing and more-productive technique for producing salt. Nevertheless, the Romans preferred to have their first salt marshes in the south, notably at Marennes, and on the banks of the river Seudre. Salt production, which before had been driven by profit, could be done faster around the Gironde, which became an important arterial river for the transport of goods to and from the southern provinces of the Roman Empire.

During the first three centuries of the Gallo-Roman period, the Romans were especially keen to colonise the area between the coastline of Aunis and the ancient sylve d'Argenson ("Forest of Argenson"), taking lands latterly in Santone hands. The new colonists, somewhat turning their backs to the sea, set up their  – large farms of some dozens of acres, predating the towns themselves – at Ardillières, Le Thou, Ballon, and Thairé. All these sites left numerous archaeological finds: at Ballon, the remains of a Gallo-Roman villa have been found; at Ardillières, tombs with Gallo-Roman objects have been recovered; at Thou, a Gallo-Roman villa and some coins were discovered in the 19th century.

However, near the end of the 3rd century AD, the  entered a new age of prosperity, and its northern part was just as prosperous, after it was integrated into Aquitaine. The Romans also had interests in the "Pays des Aulnes" and had started to clear the Forest of Argenson on its eastern border. Here remains of a Gallo-Roman villa have been restored, together with many fragmentary finds. At Saint-Georges-du-Bois, previously Argenton, the Romans built a small amphitheatre.

In the 4th century AD the Romans decided to clear the Forest of Argenson along the southern shores of the Gulf of Pictones, which had been occupied by Celts since ancient times.

These attempts at deforestation and colonisation did succeed, albeit belatedly, but came to a halt with the invasions of the 5th century AD. So, the "barbarous" people sealed the fall of the western Roman Empire, with pillage and destruction from which Santonie did not escape. The province was then occupied by the Visigoths from the start of the 5th century AD, and then by the Franks, who took over after their victory in Vouillé in 507 AD.

The "pagus alnensis" in the Middle Ages
Aunis was once again neglected throughout the Middle Ages, "ignoring" the barbarians who had, after all, appropriated the great Roman roads during their invasions. From the time the Franks settled in the 6th century to the Carolingian dynasty in the 9th power in the province was unstable and autarchic.

It was under Carolingian rule that Saintonge truly entered recorded history.

Its name, appears for the first time in 785. It was under the control of the Counts of Poitou. Towards the end of the 10th century, after Carolingian power collapsed, Aunis separated from Saintonge and had its first capital, Châtelaillon.

In the 9th and 10th centuries the Counts of Poitou hastened to fortify the Aunis coast. They built the four-tower fortress at Châtelaillon as their stronghold to deal with the Viking threat. But repeated Norman incursions into the interior, reached by river and stream, caused great insecurity.

At the end of the 11th century, the Counts of Poitou started to pay attention to the forsaken backwaters of the region, and made them a priority. Above all, they encouraged powerful abbeys to be founded after clearing the Forest of Argenson.  Abbey was built in Benon, being the first Cistercian abbey to be founded in Aunis, and an active participant in the forest clearing movement. The clearings opened the way into the ancient forest to set up villages and farming (wheat, oats, barley) and to plant vines. The powerful monasteries, backed up by the lords, helped with the clearings of Aunis in the 11th century. But it is mostly during the 12th and 13th centuries that these earthworks were completed; much later that they became the "plain" of Aunis.

On the coast, the salt waters had become amenable and created Aunis's wealth, and by the end of the 11th century its prosperity was assured. Châtelaillon rapidly became the largest fortified city in Aunis and an important port for the transport of salt from Aunis, and wine from Saintonge.

After the demise of Châtelaillon in 1130, La Rochelle quickly rose to prominence and became the new capital of Aunis: "The demise of Châtelaillon dates to 1130, but it was only in 1144 that Alon family control was removed. A party assembled at Mauléon, the nearest island to Aunis, and they built the new town of La Rochelle there starting in 1151".

The province was thus controlled in 1130 by William X, Duke of Aquitaine, bringing the dowry of Eleanor of Aquitaine to Louis VII of France, then, after their divorce and her remarriage, to King Henry II of England. Aunis was returned to the French with Louis VIII of France in 1224, but was restored by the Treaty of Brittany in 1360 by John II of France. This yoke was shaken off in 1371, and the province restored to King Charles V of France.

Birth of the province 

In 1374 the King officially separated Saintonge in 1374 and set up Aunis: "In 1374, Charles V separated La Rochelle from Saintonge to set up a provincial government, comprising the jurisdictions of Rochefort, Marennes and, for a time, Benon. It was thus that Aunis legally became a separate province."

The province was much larger in mediaeval times, and underwent numerous changes to its borders. It extended from the Marais Poitevin in the north, to the lower valley of the Charente in the south; to the west, it included the islands of Île de Ré and the Île d'Aix, at the mouth of the Charente. However, in the east the borders were often ill-defined and subject to change. With the official establishment of the province in 1374, during the reign of Charles V of France, Aunis recovered Rochefort and Marennes, but its eastern boundaries were still vague.

During the Reformation 

The Protestant Reformation, started in the time of Francis I of France, gave Aunis much greater power: it was the last stand of the resistance movement, which survived until La Rochelle fell in 1628.

End of the Ancien Régime 

Despite the resistance of its inhabitants and the energetic interventions of its leaders, in 1790 it was coalesced with the much larger region of Saintonge to form the Department of Charente-Maritime.

Quote

Places of interest 

In La Rochelle:
 The Saint Nicolas Tower, The Chain Tower, Lantern Tower (La Rochelle, France).
 La Rochelle Town Hall, in the Renaissance style.

In Surgères:
 The Romanesque church of Notre-Dame.

In Rochefort:
 The Royal Ropemakers.

Notable people 
Amador de la Porte, Governor of the Saintonge and Aunis regions.

Notes

References

Sources

External links 
 The history of Aunis from old records (database of  surnames and placenames at histoirepassion.eu 
 Flags, coats of arms and emblems of Poitou-Charentes at free.fr 
 The Forest of Argenson between Santones and Pictones, the story of a disappearing act at histoirepassion.eu 

 
Former provinces of France
Geography of Charente-Maritime
Santones
History of Nouvelle-Aquitaine
History of Charente-Maritime